Qiaoshan Township is a township in Luocheng Mulao Autonomous County, Guangxi, China.

Administrative division
As of 2021, the township is divided into one community and six villages: 
Qiaoshan Community
Qiaoben
Gujin
Gucheng
Dacheng
Yankou
Bantuan

History
The region belonged to three townships in 1934 during the Republic of China, namely Qiaoshan Township, Guluo Township and Banshai Township.

After the founding of the Communist State, in 1950, its name was changed to the Third District and soon was renamed the Sixth District in 1952. In 1958, it split into three communes: Qiaoshan People's Commune, Banwen People's Commune, and Gujin People's Commune, and the three merged to form Qiaoshan District in 1962. It was incorporated as a township in 1984.

Geography
The township lies at the northwest of Luocheng Mulao Autonomous County. It is surrounded by Baotan Township on the north, Huaqun Town and Naweng Township on the west, the towns of Dongmen and Huangjin on the east, and the town of Tianhe on the south.

There are two rivers in the township: Xinhua River and Baotan River.

Economy
The economy of the township is strongly based on agriculture, including farming and pig-breeding. The main crops are rice and corn. Economic crops are mainly sugarcane and soybean.

Demographics

The 2019 census reported the township had a population of 20,843.

References

Bibliography

 

Divisions of Luocheng Mulao Autonomous County